Blackfoot Creek is a stream in the U.S. state of South Dakota.

Blackfoot Creek was named after the Blackfoot Sioux.

See also
List of rivers of South Dakota

References

Rivers of Corson County, South Dakota
Rivers of South Dakota